Dallas Union Station, officially Eddie Bernice Johnson Union Station (or simply EBJ Union Station), also known as Dallas Union Terminal, is a large intermodal railroad station in Dallas, Texas. It is the third busiest Amtrak station in Texas, behind Fort Worth Central Station and San Antonio station. It serves DART Light Rail Blue and Red lines,  commuter rail and Amtrak intercity rail. It is located on Houston Street, between Wood and Young Streets, in the Reunion district of Downtown Dallas. The structure is a Dallas Landmark and is listed on the National Register of Historic Places.

Services

The station is served by Amtrak's Texas Eagle with Chicago as the eastern terminus and either San Antonio or Los Angeles as the western terminus. Union Station is the northern terminus of the Dallas Streetcar and provides access to the Greyhound bus terminal, the George Allen Courts Building, Dealey Plaza, the Hyatt Regency Dallas at Reunion and Reunion Tower.

The first floor is occupied by an Amtrak ticketing window, waiting room, and privately rented offices. The second floor contains the restored Grand Hall and several meeting rooms named after railroads that previously serviced Dallas. The second floor and a mezzanine are operated by Wolfgang Puck Catering.

History
The Union Terminal Company constructed the Dallas Union Terminal, as Union Station was originally called, in 1916 to consolidate five rail stations scattered around Dallas into one, making Dallas a major transportation center in the Southern United States. At the peak of its usage, as many as 80 trains stopped each day at the station.  It was designed by Jarvis Hunt, who designed other large train stations. Railroads served by the station included Atchison, Topeka and Santa Fe Railway ('Santa Fe'), St. Louis Southwestern Railway ('Cotton Belt'), Fort Worth & Denver Railway, Chicago, Rock Island and Pacific Railroad ('Rock Island'), Burlington-Rock Island Railroad, St. Louis and San Francisco Railway ('Frisco'), Missouri–Kansas–Texas Railroad ('Katy'), Southern Pacific Railroad and Texas & Pacific Railway.

In 1954, the building served as a temporary library while the Dallas Public Library system built a new central library to replace the original Carnegie Library.

Originally, the 2nd level waiting room was connected to train platforms via an overhead walkway, but this design was never popular with travelers as they needed to climb a large number of stairs. Escalators were added, but the Grand Hall was finally abandoned in favor of renovated ticketing and a waiting room on the ground floor (still in use today). Also, an underground corridor replaced the overhead walkway, with ramps at each platform. Despite Dallas' status as the second most populous city of the state at the time, the Dallas Union station was eclipsed in some regard by Fort Worth Union station. For example, the Rock Island Railroad's Twin Star Rocket from Minneapolis terminated at Fort Worth, not at Dallas. The Santa Fe Railroad's Texas Chief from Chicago also took its route through Fort Worth, en route to Houston.

The last privately owned passenger train to serve Union Station, the Missouri Pacific Railroad's Texas Eagle, left on May 31, 1969. When it began in the spring of 1971, Amtrak initially consolidated most of its Metroplex service at Fort Worth, but planned to introduce service to Dallas once improvements were made at Union Terminal, which it considered outdated. With those improvements, Amtrak service began on March 14, 1974, with the Inter-American between St. Louis and Laredo; the train evolved into today's Texas Eagle. From 1975 to 1981, the station was also served by the Lone Star, a descendant of an old Santa Fe mainstay, the Texas Chief.

DART's light-rail service began at the station on June 14, 1996. The station's upper-level waiting room was repurposed into meeting and convention space for the Hyatt Regency Dallas, which is connected via an underground walkway.

In October 2016, the Dallas City Council renamed the station to Eddie Bernice Johnson Union Station in honor of U.S. Representative Eddie Bernice Johnson.  In April 2019, DART approved the new name and held a dedication ceremony. It is mostly referred to as EBJ Union Station.

Murals
In 1934, as part of the federally sponsored Public Works of Art Project, Jerry Bywaters and Alexander Hogue were granted the first commission in Texas to create a series of 10 murals depicting events in Dallas history.  They had painted them on the walls of the second-floor lobby at the old Dallas City Hall Building, located on Harwood Street between Main and Commerce Streets.  In 1954, the original murals were destroyed when City Hall relocated.  When the station was renovated to accommodate light rail usage, the murals were partially recreated by Phillip Lamb along the train platforms at Union Station.

See also

National Register of Historic Places listings in Dallas County, Texas
Recorded Texas Historic Landmarks in Dallas County
List of Dallas Landmarks

References

External links

Union Station – Dallas Area Rapid Transit
Union Station – Trinity Railway Express
Union Station – Wolfgang Puck event venue
Dallas Union Station , from Amtrak's Texas Eagle website
Dallas Amtrak-DART-TRE Station (USA Rail Guide — Train Web)

Dallas
Economy of Dallas
Dallas Area Rapid Transit light rail stations in Dallas
Trinity Railway Express stations
Union stations in the United States
Railway stations in the United States opened in 1916
Transit centers in the United States
Beaux-Arts architecture in Texas
Dallas, Texas
Dallas, Texas
Dallas, Texas
Dallas
Dallas, Texas
Dallas, Texas
Dallas, Texas
Railway stations on the National Register of Historic Places in Texas
Railway stations in Dallas
National Register of Historic Places in Dallas
Recorded Texas Historic Landmarks
Dallas Landmarks
Former Chicago, Burlington and Quincy Railroad stations
Railway stations in Dallas County, Texas